Alkoven is a municipality in the district of Eferding in the Austrian state of Upper Austria.

Geography
Alkoven lies in the Hausruckviertel. About 17 percent of the municipality is forest and 65 percent farmland.

History
The Renaissance style Hartheim Castle is located at Alkoven. It became notorious as one of the Nazi Euthanasia killing centers, where the killing program Action T4 took place (see Hartheim Euthanasia Centre).

References

Cities and towns in Eferding District